Anthony Berenstein (born 2 March 1997) is a Dutch professional footballer who plays as a left-back for Derde Divisie club GVVV.

Club career
He made his professional debut in the Eerste Divisie for FC Dordrecht on 5 August 2016 in a game against FC Oss. He afterwards played for Magreb '90.

In February 2018, Berenstein signed with FC Volendam after a successful trial, initially joining the reserve team. He made his debut for the first team on 30 March 2018 in a 2–2 draw against Cambuur, in which he scored his first goal. 

Berenstein joined Telstar in May 2019, signing a one-year contract with an option for two more years. He made his competitive debut for the club on 16 August 2019 on the second matchday of the Eerste Divisie season, starting in a 1–0 away win over FC Den Bosch.

On 26 July 2022, Berenstein signed a one-year contract with Derde Divisie club GVVV.

International career
Born in the Netherlands, Berenstein is of Surinamese descent. He represented Netherlands national under-17 football team at the 2014 UEFA European Under-17 Championship, where Netherlands were the runner-up.

References

External links
 
 

1997 births
Footballers from Amsterdam
Living people
Dutch footballers
Dutch sportspeople of Surinamese descent
FC Dordrecht players
FC Volendam players
SC Telstar players
GVVV players
Eerste Divisie players
Derde Divisie players
Netherlands youth international footballers
Association football defenders